Life on the Line is the second studio album by English rock band Eddie and the Hot Rods. The album was mixed by Ed Hollis and Steve Nicol, produced by Ed Hollis, and engineered by Steve Lillywhite. This release is considered a step in the Punk direction for The Rods sound.

Life on the Line reached number 27 on the UK Albums Chart. The album featured three singles: "Do Anything You Wanna Do", which peaked at number 9 on the UK Singles Chart, "Life on the Line", and "Quit This Town", which reached number 36.

The song "Do Anything You Wanna Do" was covered by Manfred Mann's Earth Band for their Criminal Tango album (1986).

Track listing
"Do Anything You Wanna Do" (music: Graeme Douglas; lyrics: Ed Hollis) – 4:19
"Quit This Town" (music: Graeme; lyrics: Hollis, Douglas) – 2:27
"Telephone Girl" (music: Paul Gray, Steve Nicol; lyrics: Barry Masters) – 2:28
"What's Really Going On" (music & lyrics: Gray) – 2:17
"Ignore Them (Still Life)" (music: Douglas; lyrics: Hollis) – 4:43
"Life on the Line" (music: Douglas, Gray; lyrics: Hollis) – 4:04
"(And) Don't Believe Your Eyes" (music: Douglas; lyrics: Hollis) – 3:35
"We Sing... The Cross" (music: Douglas, Gray, Nicol) – 2:48
"Beginning of the End" (music & lyrics: Dave Higgs) – 8:17

2000 reissue bonus tracks
"I Might Be Lying" (Dave Higgs) – 5:16
"Ignore Them (Always Crashing in the Same Bar)" – 3:34
"Schoolgirl Love" (Douglas, Masters) – 3:21
"Till the Night Is Gone (Let's Rock)" – 3:13
"Flipside Rock" (With Robin Tyner) – 2:39
"Do Anything You Wanna Do" (Live) – 4:05
"What's Really Going On" (Live) (Douglas, Hollis) – 2:17
"Why Can't It Be" (Live) (Higgs) – 2:39
"Distortion May Be Expected" – 5:07

Personnel
Eddie and the Hot Rods
Barrie Masters – lead vocals
Graeme Douglas – lead and rhythm guitar, backing vocals, 12-string guitar and organ on "(And) Don't Believe Your Eyes"
Dave Higgs – rhythm guitar, backing vocals, Mellotron on "Beginning of the End"
Paul Gray – bass, backing vocals
Steve Nicol – drums, percussion, backing vocals
Technical
The Rods, Graeme Douglas, Steve Lillywhite - assistant production
Ed Hollis, Steve Lillywhite - mixing
Steve Lillywhite - engineer
Edward Barker, Keith Morris - design, photography

Charts

Singles

References 

1977 albums
Eddie and the Hot Rods albums
Island Records albums